Haly Creek is a rural locality in the South Burnett Region, Queensland, Australia. In the  Haly Creek had a population of 136.

Boonyouin is a neighbourhood in the locality.

Geography 
Haly Creek flows from the south-west to the north of the locality where it enters the Stuart River, which forms the western boundary of the locality. The land is mostly flat at about 450 metres above sea level but with elevations rising to 520 metres. The land is almost entirely used for agriculture with crops dominating in the north of the locality and grazing in the south.

History 
The locality is named after the creek of the same name which is in turn named after Charles Robert Haly who established the Taabinga Station in the district.

In August 1909, two acres were reserved for school purposes. The school was built by Remhart and Bonding for £216/18/-. Haly's Creek State School opened in 1910, being renamed Haly Creek State School in 1911. It closed in 1967. It was located at 299 Ellesmere Road.

A postal receiving office opened at Haly Creek on 10 August 1912 but closed on 16 December 1924, reopening on 1 July 1925. A post office opened on 1 July 1927 and closed on 3 March 1955.

Taabinga Road State School opened circa August 1924 but was renamed Boonyouin State School on 1 November 1924. It closed in 1953. It was located at approx 758 Flagstone Creek Road.

In the 2011 census, Haly Creek had a population of 235 people.

Heritage listings 
Haly Creek has a number of heritage-listed sites, including:
 7 Old Taabinga Road: Taabinga Homestead

Education
There are no schools in Haly Creek. The nearest primary schools are Kumbia State School in neighbouring Kumbia to the west and Taabinga State School in Kingaroy to the north-east. The nearest secondary school is Kingaroy State High School in Kingaroy to the north.

Economy
There are a number of homesteads in the locality:

 Abergeldie
 Boonyouin
 Chatterly
 Dalmaney
 Ivy Home
 Merlwood
 Shangri-La
 Stuartlea
 The Oaks
 Woohanga
 Woohanga

References

External links 

South Burnett Region
Localities in Queensland